Wilbur Park is a village in St. Louis County, Missouri, United States. The population was 471 at the 2010 census.

Geography
Wilbur Park is located at  (38.554452, -90.308011).

Demographics

2010 census
As of the census of 2010, there were 471 people, 203 households, and 132 families living in the village. The racial makeup of the village was 96.2% White, 0.2% African American, 1.9% Asian, and 1.7% from two or more races. Hispanic or Latino of any race were 0.4% of the population.

There were 203 households, of which 26.6% had children under the age of 18 living with them, 48.8% were married couples living together, 11.8% had a female householder with no husband present, 4.4% had a male householder with no wife present, and 35.0% were non-families. 29.1% of all households were made up of individuals, and 11.9% had someone living alone who was 65 years of age or older. The average household size was 2.32 and the average family size was 2.86.

The median age in the village was 39.2 years. 16.6% of residents were under the age of 18; 7.4% were between the ages of 18 and 24; 32.5% were from 25 to 44; 28.5% were from 45 to 64; and 15.1% were 65 years of age or older. The gender makeup of the village was 46.7% male and 53.3% female.

2000 census
As of the census of 2000, there were 475 people, 207 households, and 140 families living in the village. The racial makeup of the village was 96.00% White, 0.42% African American, 0.63% Native American, 1.47% Asian, 0.42% from other races, and 1.05% from two or more races. Hispanic or Latino of any race were 1.26% of the population.

There were 207 households, out of which 28.0% had children under the age of 18 living with them, 50.7% were married couples living together, 14.0% had a female householder with no husband present, and 31.9% were non-families. 29.0% of all households were made up of individuals, and 14.0% had someone living alone who was 65 years of age or older. The average household size was 2.29 and the average family size was 2.81.

In the village, the population was spread out, with 20.4% under the age of 18, 5.3% from 18 to 24, 33.7% from 25 to 44, 19.2% from 45 to 64, and 21.5% who were 65 years of age or older. The median age was 39 years. For every 100 females, there were 74.6 males. For every 100 females age 18 and over, there were 75.0 males.

The median income for a household in the village was $44,167, and the median income for a family was $49,583. Males had a median income of $38,750 versus $32,500 for females. The per capita income for the village was $18,263. About 4.2% of families and 4.2% of the population were below the poverty line, including 8.3% of those under age 18 and 7.1% of those age 65 or over.

References

Villages in St. Louis County, Missouri
Villages in Missouri